Omladinski košarkaški klub Šabac, commonly referred to as OKK Šabac or simply Šabac, is a men's basketball club based in Šabac, Serbia. They are currently competing in the 4th-tier Second Regional League, West Division.

Players

Coaches 

  Milovan Stepandić (1980–1990)
  Đorđe Petrović (1990–1991)
  Milovan Stepandić (1991–1996)
  Dragan Vuković (1996–1998)
  Milovan Stepandić (1998)
  Dragan Vuković (2001–2002)

Trophies and awards

Trophies
First Regional League (3rd-tier)
 Winner (2): 2010–11, 2012–13

International record

References

External links
 Profile on eurobasket.com
 Profile on srbijasport.net

Sabac
Sport in Šabac
Basketball teams established in 1995
1995 establishments in Serbia